The 2009 National Premier Soccer League season was the 7th season of the NPSL. The season began on May 2, 2009, and ended with the NPSL Championship Game in August 2009. Sonoma County Sol finished the season as national champions, beating Erie Admirals 2-1 in the championship game on August 1, 2009.

Changes from 2008

New franchises 
Twelve franchises joined the league this year, all expansion franchises:

Name changes 
Princeton 56ers changed its name to Madison 56ers

Folding 
Seven teams left the league prior to the beginning of the season:
Alabama Spirit - Birmingham, Alabama (never actually played an official NPSL game)
Atlantic City Diablos - Atlantic City, New Jersey
Lancaster Inferno - Salunga-Landisville, Pennsylvania
Milwaukee Bavarians - Milwaukee, Wisconsin
Performance FC Phoenix - Greenville, South Carolina
Queen City FC - Buffalo, New York
Santa Cruz County Breakers - Aptos, California
In addition, three 2008 teams either chose or were forced to spend the 2009 season on hiatus, with plans to return in 2010:
Albuquerque Asylum - Albuquerque, New Mexico
Arizona Sahuaros - Phoenix, Arizona
San Diego United - El Cajon, California
Also, two teams which spent the 2008 season on hiatus did not return, and left the league permanently:
Indios USA - Canutillo, Texas
Sacramento Knights - Sacramento, California

Standings
Purple indicates division title clinched
Yellow indicates team received playoff spot

Eastern Keystone Division

Note: Charm City deducted nine points for failing to fulfil its last three fixtures.

Eastern Atlantic Division

Note: Boston deducted three points for failing to fulfil its last fixture.

Southeast Division

Midwest Division

Note: Indiana deducted six points for failing to fulfil its last two fixtures.

Western Division

Playoffs

Western Division Playoffs

National Playoffs

References

National Premier Soccer League seasons
4